This is a list of professional wrestlers who currently wrestle for All Japan Pro Wrestling, as well as a list of notable alumni. The current roster consists of the Home Unit (those under exclusive contract), freelancers, gaijin and several stables.

Roster

Heavyweight Wrestlers

Junior Heavyweight Wrestlers

Referees

Corporate

Notable alumni
Multiple identities used by the same wrestler are in chronological order. In case of alternate identities used infrequently (Great Muta, Shiryu), the identity with the most frequency of use will be listed first.

Native

Ahii
Alejandro
Akebono (Note: Originally from Hawaii, United States)
Akira Hyodo
Atsushi Aoki
Arashi
Giant Baba
Bushi/T28
Riki Choshu
Kim Duk
Haruka Eigen
Fujita
Masakatsu Funaki
Ryota Hama
Gran Hamada
Animal Hamaguchi
Ashura Hara
Rocky Hata
Hayabusa
Kaz Hayashi/Shiryu
Tamon Honda
Tomoaki Honma
Taichi Ishikari
Takashi Ishikawa
Jun Izumida
Yoshinobu Kanemaru
Koji Kanemoto
Kendo Kashin
Toshiaki Kawada
Ryuichi Kawakami
Tsuyoshi Kikuchi
Kikutaro
Rusher Kimura
Kenta Kobashi
KENTA
Kuniaki Kobayashi
Satoshi Kojima/The Great Kosuke
Masayuki Kono/Kono
Shiro Koshinaka
Samson Kutsuwada
Kyotaro
Naomichi Marufuji
Hiro Matsuda
Mazada
Mitsuharu Misawa
Kazushi Miyamoto
Mitsuo Momota
Takeshi Morishima
Keiji Mutoh/The Great Muta
Yasufumi Nakanoue
Yoshinari Ogawa
Kintaro Ohki
Atsushi Onita
Akira Raijin/Sushi
Takeshi Rikio
Nosawa Rongai
Hiro Saito
Kazuo Sakurada
Seiya Sanada
The Great Sasuke
Satoru Sayama
Ryota Nakatsu
Kentaro Shiga
Jinsei Shinzaki
Go Shiozaki
Kazuharu Sonoda
Manabu Soya
Super Hate
Super Strong Machine
Akihisa Takachiho/The Great Kabuki
Yoshihiro Takayama
Masato Tanaka
Minoru Tanaka
Akira Taue
Genichiro Tenryu
Jumbo Tsuruta
Taru
Kaji Tomato
Umanosuke Ueda
Andy Wu
Hiroshi Yamato
"brother" Yasshi
Yoshiaki Yatsu
Toshiyuki Sakuda
Takayuki Ueki
Tank Nagai
Choun Shiryu
Takoyakida
Naoya Nomura
Zeus
Koji Iwamoto
Yoshihisa Uto
Koji Doi

Gaijin

Abdullah the Butcher
Johnny Ace
Gary Albright
André the Giant
Bambi Killer
Bob Backlund
The Beast
Giant Bernard
Dick Beyer
Big Daddy Voodoo
Bam Bam Bigelow
Nick Bockwinkel
Jack Brisco
D'Lo Brown
Bruiser Brody
Killer Tim Brooks
Super Destroyer
Lance Cade
Rob Van Dam
Ted DiBiase
J. J. Dillon
Tommy Dreamer
René Duprée
Wayne Ferris
Reid Flair
Ric Flair
Mick Foley
Dory Funk Jr.
Terry Funk
Doug Furnas
Anton Geesink
Luke Graham
King Curtis Iaukea
Dynamite Kid
Gene Kiniski
Terry Gordy
Stan Hansen
Charlie Haas
Curt Hennig
Hulk Hogan
Don Leo Jonathan
Rufus R. Jones
Tor Kamata
Steve Keirn
Dan Kroffat
Buddy Landell
Mark Lewin
Mil Máscaras
Mario Milano
Ron Miller
Gorilla Monsoon
Dick Murdoch
Pat O'Connor
Larry O'Dea
Bob Orton, Jr.
The Patriot
Prince Tonga/Meng
Antonio Pugliese
Harley Race
Apache Bull Ramos
Billy Robinson
Bob Roop
Rick Rude
Ro'z (Matt Anoa'i)
Bruno Sammartino
Mikel Scicluna
Larry Sharpe
Tiger Jeet Singh
Dick Slater
Alexis Smirnoff
Davey Boy Smith
Johnny Smith
Tracy Smothers
Jimmy Snuka
Ricky Steamboat
Mongolian Stomper
Super Crazy
Antonio Thomas
Big Van Vader
Vampiro
David Von Erich
Fritz Von Erich
Kerry Von Erich
Kevin Von Erich
Sailor White
Bill White
"Dr. Death" Steve Williams
Barry Windham
Tim Woods
Jimmy Yang 
Gianni Valletta

Joshi talent
Maya Yukihi
Miyuki Takase
Mochi Miyagi
Risa Sera
Tae Honma
Tsukushi

See also

List of professional wrestling rosters

References

External links
 

Roster, All Japan Pro Wrestling
Wrestling
Lists of professional wrestling personnel